Dirty Singles is a 2014 Canadian romantic-comedy feature film written and directed by Alex Pugsley.  The film was released by Video Services Corporation in Canada in September 2014 and was released in the United States in March 2016.

Plot
Dirty Singles is a feature-length comedy-drama about a community of friends a few years after university.  It's about that time in your life when you're in your first real job and your first real adult relationship—the one you think might just last forever.  In this clique of friends, Jack-and-Megan, the perfect couple—perfect house, perfect jobs, perfect hair—turn out to be not so perfect.  This revelation sends a shock through their little world, and soon the ‘break-up virus,’ and its after-effect, the ‘inappropriate hook-up virus,’ make their way through the rest of the characters.  But somewhere in this year of living ridiculously, playing grown-up must become being grown-up—and the same-old, same-old you thought would last forever proves to be as fleeting as the pop songs of three years ago.  Dirty Singles is a naturalistic coming-of-age movie about twenty-somethings generally—and specifically, it is about young adults who live around Parkdale in Toronto as they take their first faltering steps toward maturity.

Cast

Production
The film was cast in October–November 2012 and shot in December 2012 over fourteen days and thirty-one locations in the Dundas-Ossington area.

Release
The film premiered at the 2014 Calgary International Film Festival.  The film has also screened at the 2014 Vancouver International Film Festival, the 2015 Kingston Canadian Film Festival, and the 2015 Newport Beach Film Festival.

Critical reception
Dirty Singles has received generally positive reviews from critics.

Eric Volmers of the Calgary Herald writes, "Dirty Singles works because it is believable, written with an ear for natural dialogue, and performed seamlessly by the cast."

Steve Gow of the Metro News comments that "Dirty Singles is a well-balanced movie that’s reminiscent of such multi-layered rom-coms as Love Actually and Crazy Stupid Love.".

"The characters are real people," remarks Jude Klassen in Movie Entertainment Magazine, "sometimes gorgeous, and sometimes a little hung-over and defeated. The dialogue is deadly sharp without being overtly honed, a credit to both the writing and the acting."

And Bruce DeMara of the Toronto Star, in a three-out-of-four starred review, writes, "The dialogue crackles throughout with profanity, wisecracks and well-observed truisms as the players variously grapple with infidelity, STDs and achieving orgasm."

Reviewers consistently singled out the performances of Lauren Ash and Ennis Esmer, who were nominated for multiple awards for their performances as Carol and Sean, winning Best Female Performance in a Feature and Best Male Performance in a Feature respectively at the 2015 Canadian Comedy Awards.

Prizes and awards
Winner 2013 TIFF Irving Avrich Emerging Filmmaker Award (for Alex Pugsley and Melanie Windle)
Nominated for Best Canadian Feature at 2014 Vancouver International Film Festival
Nominated for Best Performance Actor Male (Ennis Esmer) at 2015 ACTRA Awards
Nominated for Best Performance Actor Female (Lauren Ash) at 2015 ACTRA Awards
Nominated for Achievement in Music (Original Song) at 2015 Canadian Screen Awards
Winner Best Male Performance (Ennis Esmer) in a Feature at 2015 Canadian Comedy Awards
Winner Best Female Performance (Lauren Ash) in a Feature at 2015 Canadian Comedy Awards

References

External links
 
 

2014 films
Canadian romantic comedy films
Films shot in Toronto
English-language Canadian films
2010s English-language films
2010s Canadian films